Iola Vivian  Johnson (born October 10, 1950) was the second African-American news anchor for a Dallas television station.

Career
Johnson was born in Texarkana, Arkansas. One of her first professional positions was with NBC affiliate KVOA in Tucson, Arizona, where she wrote for the 10 o'clock news.

In 1973, she was hired at WFAA in Dallas and debuted as a weekend news anchor in May of that year.  In 1975, she was teamed with a fellow reporter named Tracy Rowlett and together they began a ten-year run as co-anchors of the 6 and 10 pm newscasts. Within the first year, the new anchor team catapulted to number one in the ratings. It was the most successful news teams in Dallas-Fort Worth television history.  Johnson remained at WFAA-TV for more than 12 years.

Johnson is the former host of Positively Texas (a weekly public affairs television show that aired on TXA 21 KTXA, CBS 11's sister station and former UPN affiliate).

In 1985, Johnson left her anchor position with WFAA-TV to start her own business. (Her last night on WFAA-TV being March 2, 1985.) Iola's second anchor stint was with KTVI in St. Louis. Her co-anchor was Kevin Cokely, who currently works at KXAS, the NBC owned and operated station in Dallas. After working for a short time in St. Louis, she returned to Dallas to work as the managing editor and news reporter for a morning show on KKDA AM radio.

In September 2000, Johnson chose to return to television news to help launch a new hour-long newscast at 4 pm on KTVT CBS 11 in Dallas-Fort Worth with longtime friend and former WFAA colleague Tracy Rowlett. After two years, Tracy and Iola left the 4pm newscast when it was cancelled. In 2012, television came calling again and she was hired as a television contributor for The Texas Daily news program on KTXD, an independent station in the Dallas/Ft. Worth area. There, she was teamed with former WFAA anchors Jeff Brady, Tracy Rowlett, John Criswell, Phyllis Watson, Midge Hill, Debbie Denmon, and Troy Dungan.

References

Living people
1950 births
African-American television personalities
21st-century African-American people
20th-century African-American people